North Kivu is a province bordering Lake Kivu in the eastern Democratic Republic of the Congo. Its capital is Goma.

North Kivu borders the provinces of Ituri to the north, Tshopo to the northwest, Maniema to the southwest, and South Kivu to the south. To the east, it borders the countries of Uganda and Rwanda.

The province consists of three cities—Goma, Butembo and Beni—and six territories—Beni, Lubero, Masisi, Rutshuru, Nyiragongo and Walikale. It is home to the Virunga National Park, a World Heritage Site containing the endangered mountain gorillas.

The province is politically unstable and since 1998 has been one of the flashpoints of the military conflicts in the region.

North Kivu was the site of an Ebola epidemic, which was compounded by political instability in the region.

History

The frontiers of the Congo Free State were defined by the Neutrality Act during the 1885 Berlin Conference, in which the European powers staked out their territorial claims in Africa. The Congo Free State's northeastern boundary was defined in 1885 as "a straight line coming from the northern end of Lake Tanganyika and ending at a point located on the 30th east meridian and at 1° 20' south latitude; further north, the border is formed by the 30th meridian east." On this basis, all of Lake Kivu and both banks of the Ruzizi River were in the Free State.

In June 1909, John Methuen Coote started the Kivu frontier incident when he travelled southwest from the British Uganda Protectorate and established fortified camps at Burungu and Rubona on Lake Kivu. British troops under Coote withdrew from the Rubona post on 29 June 1909, and the Belgians occupied the post. After a series of incidents, the boundaries of the Congo, Uganda and Rwanda were settled in May 1910, with the eastern part of Kivu assigned to Uganda and the German colony of Rwanda.

Kivu District was created by an arrêté royal of 28 March 1912, which divided the Congo into 22 districts. By 1954, Kivu District had been split into Sud-Kivu District and Nord-Kivu District.

The region was the scene of much fighting during the Second Congo War (1998–2003) and the Kivu conflict (2004–present).

On August 19, 2003, DRC government decree 019/2003 offered Laurent Nkunda the rank of Brigadier General and command of the new Congo Government's FARDC Eighth Military Region, covering North Kivu. He declined. On May 26, 2004, General Obed Wibasira (RCD-Goma) was named to the position. But Wibasira was suspected of complicity with the soldiers in Goma who had triggered a mutiny in Bukavu in February 2004, and on January 23, 2005, he was switched with Gabriel Amisi Kumba, at the time commander of the Fifth Military Region in Kasaï-Oriental. Kumba was named as a Brigadier General when taking up the post. General Louis Ngizo, a former commander of the Rally for Congolese Democracy, was appointed a commander in November 2006. But he had little influence compared to powerful military figures from Kinshasa, U.S. diplomats said in comments released via WikiLeaks. Brigadier General Vainqueur Mayala was transferred from command of the Ituri operational zone, promoted to Major General, and appointed military region commander in May 2007. Ngizo left Goma on May 13, 2007, his next posting not being known at the time. During late 2008, the FARDC maintained its dismal record in combat against Nkunda's CNDP faction, losing the Rumangabo military camp to the rebels.

The dissident Mai-Mai 85th Brigade, commanded by Colonel Samy Matumo, controlled the cassiterite mine at Bisie, just north of Manoire in Walikale, in southeastern North Kivu. The former RCD-K/ML also has fighters in the province; 'at the beginning of the transition [2002-3] the RCD-Mouvement de Libération president declared he had 8-10,000 Armée Patriotic Congolaise (APC) troops in the Beni-Lubero area of North Kivu.' This exaggerated figure seems to have been reduced to 'several thousand' (2-4,000?) as of early 2006, following demobilizations and men joining the integrated brigades.

The Effacer le tableau and Beni massacre occurred in the province.

Approximate correspondence between historical and current province

Geography
North Kivu borders Lake Edward to its east with Uganda and Lake Kivu to its southeast with Rwanda. The Virunga Mountains extends through the province. The mountain range is the site of the volcanoes Mount Nyiragongo and Nyamuragira, where approximately 40% of Africa's volcanic activity takes place, and Virunga National Park, which hosts mountain gorillas, an endangered species.

Human rights issues

In October 2007, the United Nations High Commissioner for Refugees (UNHCR) warned of an increasing number of internally displaced people (IDP) in North Kivu related to the fighting there between the government army, the Democratic Forces for the Liberation of Rwanda (FDLR) rebels and renegade troops, including Laurent Nkunda's forces, and a buildup of military supplies and forces, including recruitment of child soldiers by armed groups across North Kivu. The UNHCR thought that there were over 370,000 people in North Kivu displaced since December 2006, and is expanding its camps in the Mugunga area, where over 80,000 IDPs were estimated. The brief capture of Goma by M23 rebels caused "tens of thousands" of refugees. The town of Sake was abandoned.

Localities
Mukulia
Mununzi
Ntamugenga

See also
 List of governors of North Kivu

References

Sources

Further reading

Denis Tull,  The reconfiguration of political order in Africa: a case study of North Kivu (DR Congo), Volume 13 of Hamburg African studies, Institut für Afrika-Kunde (Hamburg, Germany), GIGA-Hamburg, 2005, 342 pages

External links

 
Map of North Kivu

 
Provinces of the Democratic Republic of the Congo